AALA may stand for:

 Adventure Activities Licensing Authority in the United Kingdom
 American Agricultural Law Association
 Australia-Asia Literary Award
 The Los Angeles division of the recovery group Alcoholics Anonymous